Acroncosa  is a genus of snout moths in the subfamily Phycitinae. It was described by William Barnes and James Halliday McDunnough in 1917. The type species is Acroncosa albiflavella.

Species
Acroncosa albiflavella Barnes & McDunnough, 1917
Acroncosa castrella Barnes & McDunnough, 1917
Acroncosa minima Neunzig, 2003
Acroncosa similella Barnes & McDunnough, 1917

References

Phycitinae
Pyralidae genera